The 1992 Big South Conference men's basketball tournament took place March 5–7, 1992, at the Civic Center of Anderson in Anderson, South Carolina. For the first time in their school history, the Campbell Fighting Camels won the tournament, led by head coach Billy Lee. The Fighting Camels secured the Big South's automatic bid to the 1992 NCAA tournament, marking the first time that a Big South tournament champion advanced directly to the NCAA tournament (the tournament champion did not receive a bid in 1986-90, and the 1991 champion played an additional play-in game to advance to that tournament's official draw.)

This was Campbell's first and (as of 2021) only NCAA tournament appearance.

Format
All of the conference's eight members participated in the tournament, hosted at the Civic Center of Anderson. This was the first season for Liberty as a member of the conference, and the last for Davidson.

Bracket

* Asterisk indicates overtime game
Source

All-Tournament Team
Mark Mocnik, Campbell
Billy Ellison, Campbell
Joe Spinks, Campbell
Bernard Nelson, Charleston Southern
Darnell Sneed, Charleston Southern

References

Tournament
Big South Conference men's basketball tournament
Big South Conference men's basketball tournament
Big South Conference men's basketball tournament